Cooma Correctional Centre, an Australian minimum to medium prison for males, is located in Cooma, New South Wales. The centre is operated by Corrective Services NSW an agency of the Department of Attorney General and Justice of the Government of New South Wales. The centre detains sentenced prisoners and persons on remand under New South Wales and/or Commonwealth legislation.

In 1957, Cooma operated as the world's only prison specifically for detaining men convicted of homosexual offences.

Adjacent to the Correctional Centre is the Corrective Services NSW Museum, showcasing the history of NSW Corrections since 1788.

History
Construction of the Cooma Correctional Centre commenced in 1870 from local granite which was quarried from the hill where the Centre now stands. The Centre commenced operations on 1 November 1873 with 31 cells. In 1876 it was reduced to a Police Gaol and then a temporary Lunatic Asylum in 1877. The Centre closed temporarily in the early 1900s.

The Gaol reopened on 8 March 1957 and was again closed 10 July 1998. Cooma Correctional Centre reopened for the second time in November 2001 following a 20 per cent increase in the prison population between 1995 and 2001.

Facilities
The Centre is a minimum and medium security institution for inmates held in protective custody, such as former police officers, prison officers and other high-profile inmates, who would be at risk in the general prison system.

There is approximately 53 staff, consisting of 31 custodial officers, 9 overseers and 13 support staff.

When not in use, the Cooma Correctional Centre has also been a storage space for the Australian Army and for the Snowy Mountains Scheme.

Notable prisoners

The following individuals have served all or part of their sentence at the Cooma Correctional Centre:

See also

List of New South Wales prisons

References

External links 
Cooma Correctional Centre website
Corrective Services NSW Museum website

Prisons in New South Wales
1873 establishments in Australia
Cooma